Dewi Danu is the water goddess of the Balinese Hindus, who call their belief-system Agama Tirta, or belief-system of the water. She is one of two supreme deities in the Balinese tradition.

See also
Danu (Asura)

External links
Ulun Danu Batur Sacred Temple. 
 J. Stephen Lansing: A Thousand Years in Bali. The Long Now Foundation. 
Direct Water Democracy in Bali. 

Hindu goddesses
Indonesian goddesses